Surfing Life, formerly Australia’s Surfing Life, the magazine was founded in 1985 by Peter Morrison In 2016 it was purchased by Morrison Media publisher and General Manager Craig Sims (former owner of Atoll Media, publisher of Zigzag), and his Morrison Media colleagues Graeme Murdoch and Rob Bain. In 2018 Craig Sims went on the hunt for a succession as he desired to reduce his load, he found Ray Bisschop (former creative director) who he believed would be able to drive the publication forward. The first issue of Surfing Life appeared in August 1985.

References

External links

1985 establishments in Australia
Bi-monthly magazines published in Australia
Monthly magazines published in Australia
Quarterly magazines published in Australia
Sports magazines published in Australia
Magazines established in 1985
Mass media on the Gold Coast, Queensland
Surfing in Australia
Surfing magazines